Gwengwerere is a budding urban plant, a growth point in Zimbabwean sense. A Growth Point is such because it is meant to grow into a town of sorts, complete with its own industries and housing estates. It grows faster than the normal evolution of an urban entity because its purpose is to provide employment to the local area, thus improving the local economy within a short time. It is not clear whether a Growth Point would eventually have to change its name to remove the term Growth Point, after it has grown to a certain size. Judging from towns that grow into cities, its fair to assume that Growth Points would grow into towns and change their names. Zimuto area is such a scared place. It is a place full of history of early age human race. The cavemen lived in Mazambara, Chivavarira and even Gokomere mountains just to mention but a few.

Global Location
Gwengwerere Growth Point is located 12 km south of Chatsworth, Zimbabwe on the Chatsworth to Masvingo dust road. It is almost exactly midpoint between Makomba Secondary School to the east, and Chirina Railway Halt to the west.  It is on the border between the rural Nyungunya village and Chikoore Village, both under Chief Zimuto.

Brief history
Gwengwerere was started as the government's post independence attempt to develop the whole country and allow people to improve their lot without necessarily migrating to large towns and cities to find work. The concept of a growth point was based on providing everything the people need as close to them as possible, thus keeping communities intact while collectively building the nation. During the 1980 many Growth Points were seeded by the government. Investors, mainly in the form of commercial businessmen, were helped to put up structures and start viable businesses, either as individuals or as co-operatives. Many post independence blacks were experienced only in farming, shop keeping, pubs, grinding mills, and transport. Manufacturing was not commonly associated with black businessmen. For that reason, and for the fact that most growth points were at locations without electricity supply, many started as shops and pubs. Gwengwerere started as a shop owned by a local businessman, Mr Njiva. A diesel grinding mill and a pub followed and soon there was another shop. The shops were never fully stocked but the pub was popular with the locals.

During the early 1990s, there were plans to build a residential area at Gwengerere, but the competition between Growth Points was high and some lost out, Gwengerere being one of them. The main reason seems to be the fact that Chatsworth started to die off as the white commercial farmers, who had been supporting it, and the passenger train encouraging traffic through it was stopped. With that, there was no significant commercial development in the area, and Gwengwerere became known just as Gwengwerere instead of Gwengwerere Growth point. It has not grown since the mid-1980s, but crates of the famous opaque beer are still arriving either from Masvingo by bus, from Gutu by bus, or from Chatsworth by ox-drawn carts.

After 2002, under the government's national electrification programme, the implementation of which started soon after independence, Gwengwerere had access to electricity. It is hoped that this will be the obvious catalyst that triggers its growth. However, Chatsworth must grow to a viable size first, before Gwengwerere can grow, since it is a satellite point of  Chatsworth.

Access
Gwengwerere is the last outpost in the communal lands of rural Zimuto on the dust road from Masvingo. The bus driver and their passengers are watered there so the buses stop for long enough to eat.

From Masvingo it is around 60 km almost directly north. By rail from Masvingo, its 1½ km from Chirina Train Halt.
From Chatsworth its 12 km directly south, by bus, on foot or on ox drawn cart, following the Zimuto Road
From Gurajena Growth point, Gwengwerere is due west about 15 km

Population
Gwengwerere Growth Point has a population of its own of less than ten. However, there are people who spend a lot of time there who live in the nearby  homes. The people who work at Gwengwerere are shop owners who have living quarters at the backs of the shops. There are houses which were built as part of the Growth point, but because the project started in the middle of an existing community, there are homesteads all round it. These were intended to be engulfed by the growing town. So far the official Gwengerere Growth Point covers an area smaller than half a football pitch. Its fame is nearly country wide, and that is because of its unusual name, which gives an aura of a place full of adventure.

Main Activity
It serves as a community meeting place for socialising.

 Young people meet and fall in love at the shops
 Older men meet to share a drink
 Many ladies with families meet while they are shopping for salt and sugar and perhaps a loaf of bread
 School children pass by on their way from Marongere, and Makomba school a km and half to the east
 The government uses the Point as a gathering place when distributing sacks of grain and other provisions in times of droughts, or fertilisers during the rainy season. They also use it as a meeting place when vaccinating or selling party cards

Health Provision
Gwengwerere is not large enough to have its own clinic. The area has not been spared the ravages of HIV, and many young parents have died in the last two decades. The nearest clinics are : 
 Chatsworth, Zimbabwe at 12 km directly north
 Gurajena at 15 km to the east. This is a small hospital visited by a doctor maybe once per month
 Chamarare at Zimuto Mission to the south

The main problem when someone is ill is transport to the clinic. It is not uncommon to see young people wheeling a sick relative in a wheel barrow to the clinic.

Populated places in Masvingo Province